, often abbreviated as  and also known as Girls Beyond the Youth Koya in Japan, is a visual novel developed by Minato Soft, released for Windows on March 25, 2016 with a rating for all ages. An anime television series adaptation, produced by Project No.9 and directed by Takuya Satō, premiered in January 2016.

Gameplay
Girls Beyond the Wasteland is a romance visual novel in which the player assumes the role of Buntarō Hōjō. Much of its gameplay is spent on reading the story's narrative and dialogue. The text in the game is accompanied by character sprites, which represent who Buntarō is talking to, over background art. Throughout the game, the player encounters CG artwork at certain points in the story, which take the place of the background art and character sprites. The game follows a branching plot line with multiple endings, and depending on the decisions that the player makes during the game, the plot will progress in a specific direction.

There are four main plot lines that the player will have the chance to experience, one for each heroine. Throughout gameplay, the player is given multiple options to choose from, and text progression pauses at these points until a choice is made. Some decisions can lead the game to end prematurely, which offer an alternative ending to the plot. To view all plot lines in their entirety, the player will have to replay the game multiple times and choose different choices to further the plot to an alternate direction.

Characters

Buntarō, nicknamed , is the protagonist. He is hardworking, friendly, and well-aware of his surroundings. He usually writes the scenarios for the drama club, although he writes based on an existing stories. He becomes the scenario writer for the game produced by Sayuki. 

Sayuki is Buntarō's quiet classmate. She has been investigating Buntarō and convinces herself that he is fit to be scenario writer for her upcoming game. She wants to make a bishōjo game because she knows that this world is a "wasteland" where people are forced to do something they have no interest in so they can make money for living. She is inspired by her older brother who works for a game company. She loves Buntarō and kissed him in the 8th episode in the anime. She blushes really hard when Buntarō sees her in embarrassing situations or when he said something lovely to her. She goes with him on a date in the first episode in the anime. It's often hinted in the anime that she has strong feelings for Buntarō.

Yūka is Buntarō's childhood friend. She is an energetic girl who is good at acting. She is recruited to be the voice director of Sayuki's game and provides her own voice. She has feelings for Buntarō.

Nicknamed , Teruha is another of Buntarō's classmate. She is the programmer, web designer, and script composition of the game. Despite working on a bishōjo game, Teruha is a heavy fujoshi, and views the characters as men so she can get the "feeling". Teruha's way of thinking is opposite to that of Sayuki, and she is not afraid to try new things, often getting in fights with Sayuki over ideas. She also has feelings for Buntarō.

Uguisu is a first-year student, and the artist of the game. She is nicknamed  because her name stands for Japanese bush warbler. Uguisu is shy and timid, and sometimes forgets to take care of herself due to her love on drawing.

Atomu is Buntarō's childhood friend. Along with Yūka, they are a trio who are always seen together. Atomu was dumped by his girlfriend for being "too nice", which makes him hate 3D girls and couples. He doesn't have any special talents, but has the motivation that Sayuki needs, which makes him the Assistant Director.

Development and release
The planning for Girls Beyond the Wasteland was headed by Takahiro, with Romeo Tanaka writing the scenario. The art direction and character design was provided by Matsuryū. A demo was released on October 23, 2015. The game was released on March 25, 2016 for Windows.

The opening theme "Master Up" is sung by the voice cast of the main female characters: Haruka Chisuga, Kana Hanazawa, Satomi Satō and Satomi Akesaka.

Adaptations

Anime
An anime television series adaptation, produced by Project No.9 and directed by Takuya Satō, premiered on January 7, 2016. The screenplay is written by Yuniko Ayana and Takayuki Noguchi based the character design used in the anime on Matsuryū's original designs. A Blu-ray Disc containing an original video animation episode will be bundled with an "Anime Edition" of the Windows game. The anime has been licensed by Sentai Filmworks in North America, Madman Entertainment in Australia and MVM Films in the United Kingdom.

The opening theme "Wastelanders" is by Sayaka Sasaki and the ending theme  is sung by the voice cast of main female characters: Haruka Chisuga, Kana Hanazawa, Satomi Satō, and Satomi Akesaka.

Episode list

Manga
A manga adaptation with art by Kazuchi began serialization in ASCII Media Works' seinen manga magazine Dengeki G's Comic with the April 2016 issue released on February 29, 2016.

References

External links
Girls Beyond The Wasteland at Minato Soft 
Anime official website 

2016 anime television series debuts
2016 video games
Anime television series based on video games
ASCII Media Works manga
Bishōjo games
Drama anime and manga
Japan-exclusive video games
Manga based on video games
Project No.9
Romance anime and manga
School life in anime and manga
Seinen manga
Sentai Filmworks
Video games developed in Japan
Visual novels
Windows games
Windows-only games
Video games about video games